Alexander B. Witt (born 1952) is a Chilean-American filmmaker and cinematographer mostly known for his work as a camera operator and second unit director, including regular collaborations with director Ridley Scott.

Life & career 
From a 2004 interview on IGN, he says this about his history: "I was born in Chile, the third generation of Germans there. And, we moved to Mexico, from Mexico in '73 I moved to Europe, where I started working in film. I started with Arriflex, the company that makes the cameras. I was there for a year and I did kind of a trainee type of year where I was in the sound department, in the lab, in the studio working with the actual productions and also assembling cameras. And then I moved to Europe, where I lived three years, and then, back in '76, I did my first movie as a camera assistant, which was 21 Hours at Munich. And then, I kept on going, I moved up to focus puller or first AC, and then operating and then DP-ing. And then I was DP-ing commercials and then I started directing commercials in the late 80's and beginning of [the] 90's. I was working with Jan de Bont and doing his second unit as a DP while he was a DP. He is the one that really gave me the break on Speed to start directing second unit."

Witt works mostly as a second unit director and cinematographer and has worked on a plethora of films ranging from Gladiator to Cinderella. He is a frequent collaborator of director Ridley Scott, and served as the director of photography on his 2007 film Body of Lies. He made his directorial debut in 2004 with the video game adaptation Resident Evil: Apocalypse. Witt also served as the second unit director on the James Bond films Casino Royale (2006), Skyfall (2012), Spectre (2015) and No Time to Die (2020).

Filmography

As second unit director

Other roles

References

External links

American film directors
American people of German descent
Chilean emigrants to the United States
1952 births
Chilean people of German descent
Living people
Chilean film directors
People from Santiago